David Coates may refer to:
David Coates (footballer) (born 1935), English footballer
David C. Coates (1868–1933), Lieutenant Governor of Colorado
Sir David Charlton Frederick Coates, 3rd Baronet (born 1948), of the Coates baronets
David Coates (diplomat) (born 1947), British diplomat and scholar
David Coates (political economist) (1946–2018), British academic

See also
Coates (disambiguation)